The Alangan language is a language spoken by Mangyans in the province of Mindoro in the Philippines.

Alangan is spoken by 2,150 people in the following municipalities of north-central Mindoro (Ethnologue).
Sablayan municipality, Mindoro Occidental Province
Naujan municipality, Mindoro Oriental Province
Victoria municipality, Mindoro Oriental Province

The Ayan Bekeg dialect spoken on the northeast slopes of Mount Halcon is understood by Alangan speakers throughout the area (Tweddell 1970:193).

Barbian (1977) lists the following locations.
Casague, Santa Cruz, Occidental Mindoro
Kulasisi (tributary of the Mompong River), near Barrio Arellano, Sablayan, Occidental Mindoro

References

Northern Mindoro languages
Languages of Oriental Mindoro
Languages of Occidental Mindoro